The sixth series of the British television drama series Grange Hill began broadcasting on 4 January 1983, before ending on 4 March 1983 on BBC One. The series follows the lives of the staff and pupils of the eponymous school, an inner-city London comprehensive school. It consists of eighteen episodes.

Cast and characters

Pupils

Teachers

Episodes
{| class="wikitable" style="width:100%;"
|-
! style="background-color: #333333; color:white"| No.
! style="background: #333333; color:white"| Episode
! style="background: #333333; color:white"| Writer
! style="background: #333333; color:white"| Director
! style="background: #333333; color:white"| Original airdate
|-
| align="center"| 1
| align="center"| Return
| align="center"| Barry Purchese
| align="center"| Carol Wilks
| align="center"| 4 January 1983
|-
| style="background:white" colspan="5" |The new term has begun, and a new batch of first years make a start at the school. Roland tries to stand up to Gripper with disastrous results. However, Roland's classmates are determined to do something about Gripper – especially when he assaults Pogo. Meanwhile, Pogo's selling cheap pens, Jonah falls foul of the pompous new teacher Mr. Smart, and Claire discovers Gripper is attracted to her.  First Appearances: Randir Singh, Julie Marchant and Mr Nick Smart
|- style="background:#333333; height:2px"
| colspan="5" |
|-
| align="center"| 2
| align="center"| New Faces
| align="center"| Barry Purchese
| align="center"| Carol Wilks
| align="center"| 7 January 1983
|-
| style="background:white" colspan="5" |Following his clash with rival school Rodney Bennett, Zammo teams up with Jonah's cousin, Jeremy, a Rodney Bennett pupil to infiltrate the school and gain revenge on the boys who have stolen from him. Meanwhile, Annette is jealous of Fay's expertise in hockey, and her new friendship with Julie, so she steals Fay's hockey stick and frames Julie. Diane, who suffers from skin problems arrives at Grange Hill, only to be victimised by two bullies.  First Appearances: Sarah Wilks, Mandy Firth, Diane Cooney
|- style="background:#333333; height:2px"
| colspan="5" |
|-
| align="center"| 3
| align="center"| Choices
| align="center"| Jane Hollowood
| align="center"| Edward Pugh
| align="center"| 11 January 1983
|-
| style="background:white" colspan="5" |Randir, a Sikh, makes a start at Grange Hill, and wants to try for the football team, but his father would prefer he helps in the shop on Saturday. As he attempts to make friends, Randir become the victim of racism by Gripper, leading to a conflict between Grange Hill and Gripper's henchmen. Meanwhile, Claire continues to fight off the advances of Gripper, and Suzanne's new look gets her into trouble with Mrs McClusky.
First Appearance: Derick 'Woody' Woods
|- style="background:#333333; height:2px"
| colspan="5" |
|-
| align="center"| 4
| align="center"| Thuggies
| align="center"| Jane Hollowood
| align="center"| Alistair Clarke
| align="center"| 14 January 1983
|-
| style="background:white" colspan="5" |Gripper's dogged hounding of Randir causes him to align himself with Woody. Pogo asks Randir to show him how to put on a turban, but Gripper arrives and makes it clear that life's going to get tough for any "foreigners", leading to a confrontation between Gripper and Woody. Meanwhile, chaos ensures when lunch breaks are reduced to 40 minutes. Duane and Stewpot battle it out for Claire's attention.
|- style="background:#333333; height:2px"
| colspan="5" |
|-
| align="center"| 5
| align="center"| On Trial
| align="center"| Margaret Simpson
| align="center"| Carol Wilks
| align="center"| 18 January 1983
|-
| style="background:white" colspan="5" |Jeremy, Zammo and Jonah convene for another attempt at infiltrating Rodney Bennett for a laugh. At Rodney Bennett School, Zammo and Jonah get lost, and there's no sign of Jeremy. They find him in a maths lesson, but the rest of the class rumbles their presence. Meanwhile, Miss Mooney pairs off Roland, whose troubles with Gripper have returned, with Diane, much to their mutual disgust.
|- style="background:#333333; height:2px"
| colspan="5" |
|-
| align="center"| 6
| align="center"| Field Trip
| align="center"| Margaret Simpson
| align="center"| TBA
| align="center"| 21 January 1983
|-
| style="background:white" colspan="5" |Grange Hill are on a school trip to St Albans and Annette becomes tired of Diane's superior local knowledge, leading Annette to fall out with Diane. Diane then storms off on her own. Zammo buys a guide on the history of St Albans so he doesn't have to do any work. Boys in a car take Julie's crisps and they later approach Annette and Julie and they get into the car - they both realize the car isn't taking them to the Roman theatre. Meanwhile, Roly is in the cafe eating and sees some older, local people talking so records their conversation. Jonah wins a lot of money on the fruit machines. Later, they are all reunited and Zammo and Jonah lie about finding the history of the town when Mr Butterworth buys an identical guide.
|- style="background:#333333; height:2px"
| colspan="5" |
|-
| align="center"| 7
| align="center"| Love Triangle
| align="center"| Margaret Simpson
| align="center"| Carol Wilks 
| align="center"| 25 January 1983
|- 
| style="background:white" colspan="5" | Suzanne's mum walks Suzanne to school to make sure she doesn't bunk off, however she tries to leave in registration before Mr Hopwood arrives. Unfortunately, Mr Hopwood catches her. Stewpot writes Claire's name on his hand and when she finds out, she isn't amused by it. Gripper's racist attitude becomes worse when he tries to get the white kids in the school to agree to an oath. He tries to get Stewpot to agree, but he refuses and as soon as Gripper starts beating Stewpot up, he is interrupted by Mr Hopwood. When Gripper crumples up Precious' map because she won't leave a table, she has had it and stands up to Gripper, who finally moves.
|- style="background:#333333; height:2px"
| colspan="5" |
|-
| align="center"| 8
| align="center"| Weightwatchers
| align="center"| David Angus
| align="center"| Alistair Clarke
| align="center"| 28 January 1983
|-
| style="background:white" colspan="5" |Zammo and Jonah bring in a monkey mask. Roland accuses Annette of bullying him about his weight. When Annette is confronted by Mrs McClusky and Miss Mooney, Annette tells them that Roland has been picking on Diane about her spots. Fay also is worried about Diane's weight. Julie also goes round every member of staff to see how many qualifications they have. When she asks Mr Smart, she accidentally drops all her notes and he insists on telling her about his career after school.
|- style="background:#333333; height:2px"
| colspan="5" |
|-
| align="center"| 9
| align="center"| Open Day
| align="center"| Paula Milne
| align="center"| Alistair Clarke
| align="center"| 1 February 1983
|-
| style="background:white" colspan="5" | Open Day is approaching at Grange Hill and the pupils have to create a project. Zammo and Jonah are doing a project of measurement using the computer - which contains the aspect of gambling. Gripper wanted to make wooden guns for his project, but instead he's asked to carve something. Glenroy's Rasta project is successful, until Gripper sabotages it. Miss Mooney tells Zammo's mother that her son seems to be operating on flexi-time. Suzanne is happy when Mr. Hopwood is trying to get her onto Media Studies, however, she finds out someone dropped out - so Mr Hopwood did nothing.
|- style="background:#333333; height:2px"
| colspan="5" |
|-
| align="center"| 10
| align="center"| An Inspector Calls
| align="center"| Margaret Simpson
| align="center"| Alistair Clarke
| align="center"| 4 February 1983
|-
| style="background:white" colspan="5" | Mr Knowles, a new teacher, is put to the test with N2 and they cause havoc for him until Mr Smart appears. Fay, Julie and Annette follow Mr Knowles to the shop at lunch for their own amusement. Jonah has plans for flexi-time, but at the school council meeting, all the teachers are against it due to the inconvenience it would cause with the timetable. Zammo overhears Mrs McClusky saying that Mr Knowles is being inspected, so he alerts the rest of his class who agree to behave because they actually like him. When the inspector comes, N2 are well behaved and Mr Knowles can't believe it!  First appearance: Mr Knowles
|- style="background:#333333; height:2px"
| colspan="5" |
|-
| align="center"| 11
| align="center"| Paper Chase
| align="center"| David Angus
| align="center"| Carol Wilks
| align="center"| 8 February 1983
|-
| style="background:white" colspan="5" | Pogo's maths book is ruined and he tells Mr Keating it is in that state because he dropped it in the bath, however Pogo doesn't get another maths book. The school magazine is currently banned, but Suzanne has plans to create her own. Meanwhile, Pogo finds that there is a market for school exercise books. He finds that there is another entry into the stationery room via the toilets. Suzanne tries to get paper from the photocopier for her magazine but fails to get past Miss Mooney. She and Claire burst in on Pogo, who is in the girls' toilets, and Suzanne climbs through the hole in the wall and says to Claire that there is enough paper to keep the magazine going for a whole year!
|- style="background:#333333; height:2px"
| colspan="5" |
|-
| align="center"| 12
| align="center"|Publication
| align="center"| Margaret Simpson
| align="center"| Carol Wilks
| align="center"| 11 February 1983
|-
| style="background:white" colspan="5" | Suzanne and Claire are close to producing the first edition of their magazine, but are stumped with finding a way they can print it. In the boy's toilets, Gripper decides to soak some first years and is later surprised by a response and a fight breaks out. Mr Hopwood tries to break up the fight and calls for Mr. Baxter and Mr Keating. All the boys involved are given a two-week suspension. Suzanne and Claire print out the first issue of the school magazine. Claire and Stewpot are caught necking in a cupboard, and it's the last straw for Mrs. McClusky who's just read the magazine and suspends Claire and Stewpot.
|- style="background:#333333; height:2px"
| colspan="5" |
|-
| align="center"| 13
| align="center"| Backlash
| align="center"| Barry Purchese
| align="center"| Alistair Clarke
| align="center"| 15 February 1983
|-
| style="background:white" colspan="5" | Denny Rees is labelled "Igor" since Gripper is suspended, and he is derided by his classmates. Claire's mother talks to Stewpot's father while waiting to see Mrs. McClusky. Denny speaks to Mr. McGuffey about his position as Gripper's sidekick, and how he'd like to start again. Suzanne and Claire want to publish a second issue of their magazine, but need someone to get more paper. Mr McGuffy asks the girls if they'd forgive Denny Rees. Claire and Suzanne take the opportunity of making Denny do their dirty work and get the paper Mrs. McClusky catches Denny on the steps, picking up the paper after his bag splits, but it's Mr McGuffey that Mrs McClusky is after and she is convinced he is involved.
|- style="background:#333333; height:2px"
| colspan="5" |
|-
| align="center"| 14
| align="center"| Repercussions
| align="center"| Barry Purchese
| align="center"| Alistair Clarke
| align="center"| 18 February 1983
|-
| style="background:white" colspan="5" | Gripper is back from suspension and Mrs McClusky meets with Mr McGuffey about his involvement in the school magazine and Mrs McClusky suspends him. Gripper and his gang corner Randir in the toilets, but Mr Baxter hears them from down the corridor and barges in and gives Gripper a dunking in the basin. Mrs. McClusky goes ahead with a referendum on flexi-time and tells Mr Keating the idea would have to go through the governors. Claire comes face to face with Gripper, who's not happy about the magazine article she wrote. Stewpot alerts the others, but it's too late to stop Claire getting a face-full of mop. Pogo leads them all to Gripper, but Mr. Baxter interrupts again and makes sure that he will get Gripper expelled.
Final Appearance: Gripper Stebson (as a series regular), Derick 'Woody' Woods and Denny Rees
|- style="background:#333333; height:2px"
| colspan="5" |
|-
| align="center"| 15
| align="center"| Outward Bound – Part 1
| align="center"| Jane Hollowood
| align="center"| TBA
| align="center"| 22 February 1983
|-
| style="background:white" colspan="5" | N2 are off for an outward bound course in Wales. When they arrive, Mr Baxter and Miss Mooney are shocked to discover that the kids will be calling them by their first names (Geoff and Terri). They are even more shocked when they have to join in with the activities. Fay turns out to be excellent at climbing, but Roly struggles on the first wall-climbing exercise. When they have to do the tunnel activity, Roly sneaks off and covers himself in dirt. Roly is scared when he apparently gets chased by bulls. He meets a farmer who catches him and tells him they are cows. Roly learns some Welsh and about agriculture while he is there. When Roly makes his way back he is caught by Mr. Baxter, who is surprised by Roly's sudden knowledge of cattle breeds. Diane gets more grief about her spots, and becomes even more isolated. In the boys' dormitory, a bucket of water is placed over the door to soak Mr. Baxter. Roly falls off the bunk and sprains his ankle.
|- style="background:#333333; height:2px"
| colspan="5" |
|-
| align="center"| 16 
| align="center"| Outward Bound – Part 2
| align="center"| Jane Hollowood
| align="center"| TBA
| align="center"| 25 February 1983
|-
| style="background:white" colspan="5" | It's the last day of trip for class N2. Fay and Annette are worried about Diane's lack of appetite. Roland's hurt his foot, and is happy to stay back in the kitchen baking bread. Diane finds she is better at canoeing than she thought. The other half of the class are zip-wiring. The kids cheer Mr. Baxter on to do it, but he nearly chickens out. Zammo almost drowns when his canoe turns over, but Diane alerts the staff. There's a final barn dance and Roly receives a Welsh dictionary from Mr Price, the farmer, and Mr Baxter gets a dance from Miss Mooney. Mr Baxter tells the kids that when they are back at school, he will be called Sir or Mr Baxter, not Geoff.
|- style="background:#333333; height:2px"
| colspan="5" |
|-
| align="center"| 17
| align="center"|Sympathy
| align="center"| Barry Purchese
| align="center"| Edward Pugh
| align="center"| 1 March 1983
|-
| style="background:white" colspan="5" | Slogans are everywhere in the school saying "We Want Scruffy" to try to bring him back. Fay tries to reassure Diane about her spots and Annette, who says she may need to wear a brace by saying "It's better than being blind innit!" Also, It's the day of the referendum to vote in favour of or against the idea of flexi-time. Mr. Hopwood tries to sell the idea of the importance of the 4th year's exams, but Suzanne raises the point that there is no need since there won't be any jobs after they leave. Claire has plans for another magazine issue on "Scruffy" McGuffey. Jonah spins Fay round in delight when the result of the referendum is a yes. Fay falls to the ground, hurting her ankle and Annette and Diane point out "It's better than being blind innit!".
|- style="background:#333333; height:2px"
| colspan="5" |
|-
| align="center"| 18
| align="center"| Rally
| align="center"| Barry Purchese
| align="center"| TBA
| align="center"| 4 March 1983
|-
| style="background:white" colspan="5" | A rally is being organised by the pupils to bring back Mr McGuffey and posters and banners are being painted in secret. Mrs McClusky reinstated Mr. McGuffey - without telling the pupils. Jonah ruins the banner he was working on, by making the letters too big. However, there is a more major issue- the main school doors are locked. Jonah comes up with an idea to open the school. Jonah hides aboard a milk float and gains entry into the school while the staff are patrolling the school gates. When the staff see the kids approach from one end of the road, the teachers go to that gate. However, another set of kids enter by the other entrance. Jonah lets in the "Scruffy" protesters. Mrs. McClusky plays her trump card - the appearance of Mr. McGuffey. Claire and Suzanne are devastated that they went ahead with the protest when they learn he was reinstated the day before.

Final appearance: Mr "Hoppy" Hopwood, Miss Terri Mooney, Gordon 'Jonah' Jones
|- style="background:#333333; height:2px"
| colspan="5" |
|-
|}

Release History
The sixth series of Grange Hill was released by Eureka Entertainment on 19 November 2018. This series includes English subtitles on all 18 episodes on three DVD discs, with format of 4:3 and total running time of 451 mins. (7hrs 31min)

In 2021 the sixth series was released on the streaming platform BritBox, The opening scene from episode one featured music and radio chatter was initially cut from the dvd release. This has been fully reinstated on BritBox.

Notes

References

1983 British television seasons
Grange Hill